Bele Vrane (trans. The White Crows) were a Yugoslav rock band formed in Ljubljana in 1966.

Soon after the formation the band gained the attention of the media with their the Mamas & the Papas-influenced sound. Bele Vrane had success on Yugoslav pop festivals and their releases were praised by the media, the group becoming one of the most popular Yugoslav bands of the 1960s. They ended their activity in 1973. Although they were not among the earliest Yugoslav rock bands, Bele Vrane, as other Yugoslav 1960s rock bands, played a pioneering role on the Yugoslav rock scene.

History

1966-1973
Bele Vrane were formed in Ljubljana in 1966. The bands first lineup consisted of female vocalists Sonja Pahor and Doca Marolt, guitarist Bor Gostiša (who previously performed in the band Albatrosi), vocalist and guitarist Tadej Hrušovar, bass guitarist Đuro Penzež, organist Vanja Repinc and drummer Bojan Bračko. The band soon gained attention of the public with their The Mamas & the Papas-influenced polyphonic singing. By the end of 1967, the band's most notable lineup was formed. It featured Ditka Haberl  (vocals), Doca Marolt (vocals), Tadej Hrušovar (vocals, guitar), Bor Gostiša (guitar), Đuro Penzež (bass guitar), Ivo Umek (keyboards) and Bojan Bračko (drums). Later lineups of the band featured guitarist Iztok Pečar and drummer Mišo Gregorin. The band introduced themselves to wide audience on 7 December 1967, when they performed on the Najfotogeničnija Slovenka (The Most Photogenic Slovenian Girl) contest.

In 1968 the band competed in the first Slovenian Guitar Festival. They were among 21 bands which performed on the festival, entering the finals and winning the first place. Soon after, the band released their debut record, the EP Presenčenja (Surprises). The EP featured two of the band's own songs, "Presenčenja" and "Eskalacija" ("Escalation"), and two covers of the songs by The Mamas & the Papas, "Hey Girl" and "Twelve Thirty". The EP was praised by the press and the title track became a nationwide hit. In 1968 the band also performed at the Opatija Festival, winning the First Prize with the song "Mesto mladih" ("A Place of Youth"). As this was one of the first cases of rock band winning a prize at a pop festival in Yugoslavia, one part of the press described Bele Vrane's success on the festival as a scandal. The song was published on the band's second EP as the title track. The EP also featured the songs "Običajno popodne" ("Common Afternoon"), "Spomin" ("Memory") and "Mi mladi" ("We the Young"). At the end of 1968 they held a concert in Belgrade Youth Center, which saw large attention of the media.

During 1969 the band performed mostly in Serbia, but in the summer they performed in Trieste, in Paradiso Hall, under the Italian name Aquile Bianche (The White Eagles). At the 1969 Subotica Youth Festival the band won the First Prize with the song "Jesen na njenom dlanu" ("Autumn on the Palm of Her Hand"). They also had success with the song "Veseli vrtuljak" ("Merry Carousel"), which they performed at the 1969 Zagreb Music Festival. The song "Veseli vrtuljak" was released on a 7" single, with the song "Godišnjica" ("Anniversary") as the B-side. On the 1969 Vaš plager sezone (Your Schlager of the Season) festival they performed the song "Daj da se učini nešto" ("Let's Do Something"), which was published on the Jugoton various artists EP Vaš šlager sezone 69. During 1969 the band also participated on the Slovenska popevka (Slovenian Song) festival, and their songs "Na vrhu nebotičnika" ("At the Top of The Skyscrapers"), featuring lyrics written by poet and playwright Gregor Strniša, and "Maček v žaklju" ("Cat in the Bag") were released on the festival official album Slovenska popevka.

In 1970 the band released the single with the songs "Skrivnostna pesem" ("The Hidden Song") and "Hvala vam za vse" ("Thak You for Everyhing") and their song "Mini-maxi" was released on the split single with Sonja Gabršček's song "Iščemo očka" ("We're Looking for Dad"). They participated on the Slovenska popevka once again in 1971, with the song "Ženitovanjska" (the song being published on the festival official album), and for the third and the last time in 1973 with the song "Letalovlak" ("Airtrain").

The band ended their activity in 1973.

Post-breakup
After Bele Vrane ended their activity Ditka Haberl and Tadej Hrušovar continued their activity in the band Pepel In Kri. Đuro Penzeš and Ivo Umek formed the instrumental rock band Crne Vrane (Black Crows), Doca Marolt occasionally performing with the band. Umek later moved to the band Šok (Shock), and after he left Šok retired from music. He worked as an editor on Radio Television Ljubljana and later as an architect. Bor Gostiša continued his career as a solo artist.

The song "Presenčenja" was released in 1994 on the Komuna compilation album Sjaj izgubljene ljubavi: Muzika šezdesetih (Spark of the Lost Love: Music of the Sixties) as a part of the YU retROCKspektiva (YU RetROCKspective) album series.

In 1997 the compilation album Bele Vrane was released, featuring the detailed overview of the band's work.

Legacy
The song "Mačak v žaklju" was covered by Croatian and Yugoslav alternative rock band Let 3 on their 2000 album Jedina (Only One).

Discography

EPs
Presenečenja (1968)
Mesto mladih (1969)

Single
"Veseli vrtuljak" / "Godišnjica" (1969)
"Skrivnostna pesem" / "Hvala vam za vse" (1970)
"Iščemo očka" / "Mini-maxi" (Spit single with Sonja Gabršček; 1970)
"Kam si namenjen" / "Od srca do srca" (1971)

Compilations
Bele Vrane (1997)

Other appearances
"Ljubav stvara čuda" (Zageb 69)
"Daj da se učini nešto" (Vaš šlager sezone; 1969)
"Na vrhu nebotičnika" / "Maček v žaklju" (Slovenska popevka; 1969)
"Ženitovanjska" (Slovenska popevka; 1971)

References

External links
Bele Vrane at Discogs

Slovenian rock music groups
Slovenian pop rock music groups
Yugoslav rock music groups
Beat groups
Musical groups from Ljubljana
Musical groups established in 1966
Musical groups disestablished in 1973